I-10 is a sector of Islamabad, Pakistan. It is a lightly built area, located on the southwestern edge of the city.

I-10 borders Rawalpindi to the south and neighbors I-9 and I-11, while sectors H-9, H-10, and H-11 are located adjacent. Like most other I-sectors, I-10 is primarily a part of the industrial zone. It consists of open land with dense vegetation. It is a densely populated area.

References

Sectors of Islamabad